Adrienne Iven Mihamle (born 9 March 1983) is a Cameroonian football striker currently playing for in the Serbian First League for Spartak Subotica. As a member of the Cameroonian national team she played the 2012 Summer Olympics.

References

External links 
 
 

1983 births
Living people
Cameroonian women's footballers
Women's association football forwards
ŽFK Spartak Subotica players
Cameroon women's international footballers
Olympic footballers of Cameroon
Footballers at the 2012 Summer Olympics
Cameroonian expatriate women's footballers
Cameroonian expatriate sportspeople in Serbia
Expatriate women's footballers in Serbia
21st-century Cameroonian women
20th-century Cameroonian women